Günter Wallraff (born 1 October 1942) is a German writer and undercover journalist.

Research methods
Wallraff came to prominence thanks to his striking journalistic research methods and several major books on lower class working conditions and tabloid journalism. This style of research is based on what the reporter experiences personally after covertly becoming part of the subgroup under investigation. Wallraff would construct a fictional identity so that he was not recognisable as a journalist.

Undercover work
Wallraff invoked his constitutional right of conscientious objection to conscription in Germany into armed military service, thus being required to carry out alternative civilian service. Having missed the deadline for filing his refusal, he was nevertheless drafted into the Bundeswehr.

Wallraff first took up this kind of investigative journalism in 1969 when he published 13 unerwünschte Reportagen ("13 undesired reports") in which he described what he experienced when acting the parts of an alcoholic, a homeless person, and a worker in a chemicals factory.

He travelled to Greece in May 1974 at the time of the Ioannides military dictatorship. While in Syntagma Square, he protested against human right violations. He was arrested and tortured by the police as he purposely did not carry on him any papers that could identify him as a foreigner. After his identity was revealed, Wallraff was convicted and sentenced to 14 months in jail. He was released in August, after the end of the dictatorship.

In 1977 Wallraff worked for four months as an editor for the tabloid Bild-Zeitung newspaper in Hanover, calling himself "Hans Esser". In his books Der Aufmacher (a pun meaning both "Lead Story" and "the one who opens") and Zeugen der Anklage ("Witnesses for the Prosecution") he portrays his experiences on the editorial staff of the paper and the journalism which he encountered there, which at times displayed contempt for humanity. In 1987 the journalist Hermann L. Gremliza claimed that he, rather than Wallraff, had written parts of Der Aufmacher. The book also formed the basis for the English-language film The Man Inside from 1990, starring Jürgen Prochnow as Wallraff.

Ganz unten ("Lowest of the Low") (1985) documented Wallraff's posing as a Turkish "Gastarbeiter", and the mistreatment he received in that role at the hands of employers, landlords and the German government.

In 1986 he was awarded Laureate of the International Botev Prize.

In January 2003, Russia turned away Wallraff and two other Germans, the former labour minister for the CDU Norbert Blüm and Rupert Neudeck, head of the relief organisation Cap Anamur, as they tried to enter the country to work on a human rights article about Chechnya.

In May 2007, Wallraff announced that he had started yet another undercover journalist work, this time at a German call centre.

During 2009 he wore blackface around Germany in an undercover story to expose latent or explicit racism against black men, releasing the documentary Black on White to show his experiences. Wallraff was criticized by some for this work, such as a suggestion that Wallraff was only interested in earning money from his investigations, or that the method itself was racist.

His investigative methods have led to the creation of the Swedish verb wallraffa, meaning "to expose misconduct from the inside by assuming a role". The word is currently (as of 2023) included in the dictionary Svenska Akademiens Ordlista.

Responses and repercussions

Wallraff has been heavily criticised by those on the receiving end of his style of investigation, via attempts to frame his work as breaching privacy rights or revealing trade secrets. Attempts were made on a number of occasions to legally prevent Wallraff's investigative methods, but his actions were regularly ruled constitutional by the courts. The courts opined that freedom of the press and public interest in areas concerned with the formation of public opinion favoured Wallraff's actions. In balancing public interest with the competing interests of those immediately affected by his actions it follows however that private conversations, for example, may not be published.

In September 2003, investigations were made by the Stasi Records Agency into the Rosenholz files on Stasi workers which somehow got into the hands of the CIA; as a result, it was claimed that Wallraff had had connections to the Stasi in the 1960s. Wallraff disputes that he ever actively worked for them. On 17 December 2004, the Hamburg district court ruled on a suit brought by Wallraff that he must not be described as an Inoffizieller Mitarbeiter or Stasi collaborator (he was being called this above all in newspapers belonging to the Axel Springer Verlag, the publishers of Bild) as no proof of collaboration could be furnished in the documents which had been presented.

References

Some of the material in this article is translated from the corresponding article from the German Wikipedia, retrieved 10 April 2005.

External links

 Official website 
  
 Undercover, Die Zeit Nr. 22, 2007 
 Unser täglich Brötchen, Die Zeit Nr. 19, 2008 
 Unter null, Die Zeit Nr. 11, 2009 
 In fremder Haut, Die Zeit Nr. 43, 2009 
 Günter Wallraff in: NRW Literatur im Netz 
 Barbara Stühlmeyer: Wegschauen geht nicht. An interview with Günter Wallraff for his 75. birthday. In: Die Tagespost, September 30, 2017, S. 10 

1942 births
Living people
German journalists
German male journalists
German people imprisoned abroad
German investigative journalists
People from Burscheid
People from the Rhine Province
Undercover journalists
German male writers
20th-century German journalists
21st-century German journalists